is a former Japanese football player and manager. He played for Japan national team.

Club career
Yamamoto was born in Numazu on April 4, 1958. After graduating from Kokushikan University, he joined Yamaha Motors in 1981. First season, the club finished at bottom place and was relegated to Division 2. In 1982, the club won the champions and was promoted Division 1. The club also won 1982 Emperor's Cup. He retired in 1987. He played 109 games and scored 3 goals in the league.

National team career
In December 1980, when Yamamoto was a Kokushikan University student, he was selected Japan national team for 1982 World Cup qualification. At this qualification, on December 26, he debuted against China. He played 4 games for Japan in 1981.

Coaching career
After retirement, Yamamoto started coaching career at Yamaha Motors (later Júbilo Iwata) in 1987. He became a manager for Japan U-20 national team and managed at 1997 World Youth Championship. In 1997, he returned to Júbilo Iwata. In October 1998, he became a coach for Japan national team under manager Philippe Troussier. After 2002 World Cup, in August, Yamamoto became a manager for Japan U-23 national team and managed at 2004 Summer Olympics. In November 2004, he returned to Júbilo Iwata and became a manager. He resigned in June 2006.

Club statistics

National team statistics

Managerial statistics

References

External links
 
 Japan National Football Team Database

1958 births
Living people
Kokushikan University alumni
Association football people from Shizuoka Prefecture
Japanese footballers
Japan international footballers
Japan Soccer League players
Júbilo Iwata players
Japanese football managers
J1 League managers
Júbilo Iwata managers
Association football defenders